The term/code Z4 has several uses, including the following:

 Z4 (computer), the first computer in the world to actually be sold in 1950
 Z-4 plan, a plan that was meant to stop the Croatian War of Independence in 1994
 BMW Z4, a BMW sports car model
 Hafdasa Z-4, an Argentine submachine gun
 German destroyer Z4 Richard Beitzen
 Z-4, U.S. Army designation for Hybrid Air Vehicles HAV 304/Airlander 10
 Moto Z4, a smartphone
 LNER Class Z4, a class of British steam locomotives 
 Sony Xperia Z4, a smartphone
 the IATA airline designator code for Zoom Airlines

See also
4Z (disambiguation)